The 1986 Hewlett-Packard Trophy was a women's tennis tournament played on indoor carpet courts in Hilversum, Netherlands which was part of the 1986 WTA Tour. It was the 2nd and last edition off the tournament and was played from 29 September until 5 October 1986. First-seeded Helena Suková won the singles title.

Finals

Singles
 Helena Suková defeated  Catherine Tanvier 6–2, 7–5
 It was Suková 2nd singles title of the year and the 4th of her career

Doubles
 Kathy Jordan /  Helena Suková defeated  Tine Scheuer-Larsen /  Catherine Tanvier 7–5, 6–1

References

External links
 ITF tournament edition details

Hewlett-Packard Trophy
1986 in Dutch sport